Mikkel Engvang Cramer (born 25 January 1992) is a retired Danish footballer who played as a left back.

References

External links
 Mikkel Engvang Cramer Landsholddatabasen, Danish Football Association, Retrieved 7 February 2013.
 Mikkel Cramer Danskfodbold.com
 Mikkel Cramer at Soccerway

1992 births
Living people
Danish men's footballers
Randers FC players
Akademisk Boldklub players
AC Horsens players
Danish Superliga players
Association football defenders